Stewart Lake may refer to:

Stewart Lake (Minnesota), a lake in Crow Wing County
Stewart Lake (Granite County, Montana), one of Granite County's lakes
Stewart Lake (New York), a lake in Fulton County
Stewart Lake National Wildlife Refuge, a protected area in North Dakota